Mabrouk Zaid (born 11 February 1979) is a Saudi Arabian former association football player who last played as a goalkeeper for Al-Ittihad.

Zaid was a member of the Saudi Arabia national team and was called up to the squad to participate in the 2006 FIFA World Cup.

Honours

International
Gulf Cup of Nations: 2003

Al-Ittihad
AFC Champions League: 2004, 2005
Saudi Professional League: 2000–01, 2002–03, 2006–07, 2008–09
Saudi Crown Prince Cup: 2001, 2004
Arab Champions League: 2004–05
Saudi-Egyptian Super Cup: 2001, 2003

References

1979 births
Living people
Sportspeople from Riyadh
Saudi Arabian footballers
Saudi Arabia international footballers
Ittihad FC players
2002 FIFA World Cup players
2004 AFC Asian Cup players
2006 FIFA World Cup players
2011 AFC Asian Cup players
Association football goalkeepers
Al-Riyadh SC players
Saudi Professional League players